MNK may refer to:
 m,n,k-game, an abstract board game
 Marine Nationale Khmère (Khmer National Navy, the navy of the Khmer Republic)
 Mandinka language, a Mandé language spoken in western Africa
 MAPK-interacting kinase, a signalling protein
 Menkes disease, a disorder that affects copper levels in the body
 Methyl nonyl ketone, an oily organic liquid used in insect repellent
 Mallinckrodt, a pharmaceutical company with stock symbol MNK
 Mashd N Kutcher an Australian duo

MNK is an abbreviation of:
MNK, Muzeum Narodowe w Krakowie